Inua M. M. Ellams  (born 23 October 1984) is a UK-based poet, playwright and performer.

Work 

Ellams has written for the Royal Shakespeare Company, Royal National Theatre and the BBC. In June 2018, Ellams was elected as a Fellow of the Royal Society of Literature as part of its 40 Under 40 initiative.

Poetry 
 Thirteen Fairy Negro Tales (flipped eye, 2005)

 Candy Coated Unicorns and Converse All Stars (flipped eye, 2011)

 The Wire-Headed Heathen (Akashic Books, 2016)

Featured in anthologies 
The Salt Book of Younger Poets (Salt, 2011)

 The Valley Press Anthology of Prose Poetry (Valley Press, 2019)

 Ten: The New Wave (Bloodaxe, 2014)

Performances and plays

The 14th Tale 
Ellams's one-man show The 14th Tale was awarded an Edinburgh Fringe First at the Edinburgh International Festival in 2009 and later transferred to the Royal National Theatre, London.

Untitled 
A one-man show staged at the Soho Theatre in 2010, telling the story of twins born on Nigeria's independence day.

Barber Shop Chronicles 
Barber Shop Chronicles is a play set in black barber shops in six cities on one day, against the backdrop of a football match between Chelsea and Barcelona. The play explores the African diaspora in the UK, masculinity, homosexuality and religion. The play was produced by the National Theatre, Fuel Theatre and Leeds Playhouse and was shortlisted for the Alfred Fagon Award in 2017. Following a period of touring, the play was also performed at the Roundhouse in 2019, and a recording of the National Theatre production was streamed in May 2020 as part of the National Theatre at Home season. For the production, Ellams recorded 60 hours of "male banter" in barbershops all over Africa and in London at his barber Peter's shop Emmanuel's in Clapham Junction. This project originally did not secure funding.

The Half God of Rainfall 
In April 2019 his new play, The Half God of Rainfall, was presented at the Birmingham Repertory Theatre, in advance of its run at London's Kiln Theatre, as well as its publication as a book.

Three Sisters 
In December 2019–February 2020 Ellams's reworking of  Chekhov's play Three Sisters was performed at the Royal National Theatre, London. The play restaged the story in the 1960s in the midst of the Biafran war in Nigeria.

An Evening with an Immigrant 
In 2020 Ellams performed a live stage programme with anecdotes of his childhood and his experiences as a refugee. An excerpt was shown at the Hay Festival on 24 May 2020.

Awards 
 2008: winner of an Edinburgh Fringe First Award for The 14th Tale.
 2014: Live Canon International Poetry Prize.
 2017: shortlisted for the Alfred Fagon Award, for The Barber Shop Chronicles.
 2018: elected a Fellow of the Royal Society of Literature.
 2020: winner of the medal for Poetry at the Hay Festival for The Half God of Rainfall and for The Barber Shop Chronicles,

References

External links 
Official website
Interview with Inua Ellams by The Poetry Extension

1984 births
21st-century British dramatists and playwrights
21st-century British male writers
21st-century British poets
Black British writers
British male dramatists and playwrights
British male poets
Fellows of the Royal Society of Literature
Living people
People from Jos